Albert Khachumyan (born 23 June 1999) is an Armenian football player. He last played for FC Ararat-Armenia.

International career
He made his debut for Armenia national football team on 5 June 2021 in a friendly against Sweden. He substituted André Calisir in the 74th minute.

References

External links
 
 

1999 births
Footballers from Yerevan
Living people
Armenian footballers
Armenia youth international footballers
Armenia under-21 international footballers
Armenia international footballers
Association football defenders
FC Pyunik players
FC Ararat-Armenia players
Armenian Premier League players
Armenian First League players